Mean Greens is an album by American jazz saxophonist Eddie Harris recorded in 1966 and released on the Atlantic label.

Reception
The Allmusic review states "Eddie Harris' trademark chops and versatility are well showcased on this respectable follow up to Harris' excellent Atlantic debut, The In Sound. Mean Greens doesn't have a signature piece, like The In Sound'''s "Freedom Jazz Dance," but the program of mostly Harris originals is a satisfying set based around two groups".  

Track listingAll compositions by Eddie Harris except as indicated''
 "Mean Greens" - 7:27 
 "It Was a Very Good Year" (Ervin Drake) - 5:08 
 "Without You" - 3:03 
 "Yeah Yeah Yeah" - 5:12 
 "Listen Here" - 3:37 
 "Blues in the Basement" - 8:07 
 "Goin' Home" - 6:44 
Recorded in New York City on March 8, 1966 (track 1), March 9, 1966 (tracks 2-4) and June 7, 1966 (tracks 5-7)

Personnel
Eddie Harris - tenor saxophone, electric piano
Ray Codrington - trumpet, percussion (tracks 1, 4-6)
Cedar Walton - piano (tracks 1-4)
Sonny Phillips - organ (tracks 5-7) 
Ron Carter (tracks 1-4), Melvin Jackson (tracks 5-7) - bass 
Billy Higgins (tracks 1-4), Bucky Taylor (tracks 5-7) - drums 
Ray Barretto - congas, bongos (tracks 5-7)

References 

Eddie Harris albums
1967 albums
Albums produced by Nesuhi Ertegun
Atlantic Records albums